Jason Couch is an American football coach. He is the head football coach at Alma College in Alma, Michigan, a position he has held since the 2018 season.

Head coaching record

College

References

External links
 Alma profile

Year of birth missing (living people)
Living people
Alma Scots football coaches
Alma Scots football players
High school football coaches in Michigan